Diaphania dohrni is a moth in the family Crambidae. It was described by George Hampson in 1899. It is found in South America.

The length of the forewings is 14 mm. The forewings are dark brown with a purple gloss and an almost rectangular translucent band, as well as a translucent line from the inner lower angle of the band to the anal margin. The hindwings are brown with a fine triangular transparent band and long hair-like curved scales on the anal margin.

Distribution
The holotype does not have a locality label. In the original description Hampson mentioned South America as locality of his specimen. Hering mentioned in 1906 he had seen three males and one female from Rio Magdalena in Colombia.

References

Moths described in 1899
Diaphania